Bulmer is a village and civil parish in the Braintree district of Essex, England.
  According to the 2001 census it had a population of 568, increasing to 584 at the 2011 Census.  The village is about 4 miles (6.4 km) south-west of Sudbury in Suffolk. The settlement of Bulmer Tye is located to the south of the village.

Mr and Mrs Andrews, the subject of one of the most famous works of the painter Thomas Gainsborough, are buried in the churchyard whilst a memorial to them hangs within the church itself.

The village is home to Bulmer Brick and Tile Company.

References

External links
 Bulmer Brick and Tile Company

Villages in Essex
Civil parishes in Essex
Braintree District